The European U17 Badminton Championships is a tournament organized by the Badminton Europe (BE) and is held once every two years to crown the best junior badminton players in Europe. Originally known as Polonia Cup when it first started in 1990, with the current name adopted in 2005. The individual event was first held in 2009.

Championships 
There were two experimental tournaments (Polonia Cup) in Strasbourg (1987) and Cadiz (1989) which are considered as unofficial editions.

Medal count (1990 - 2021)

* Russian medals included medals won by the USSR
* German medals included medals won by West Germany

List of medalists

Polonia Cup/Team event

Individual event

References

External links
 2009 Mixed Team
 2009 Individual
 2011 Mixed Team
 2011 Individual
 2014 Mixed Team
 2014 Individual
 2016 Mixed Team
 2016 Individual
 2017 Mixed Team
 2017 Individual

U17
Under-17 sport
Youth badminton
badminton